Christopher L. Cabaldon (born November 12, 1965) is a Filipino-American politician from California who served as mayor of West Sacramento. He is the longest-serving mayor in the city's history.  He also represents the State of California on the Western Interstate Commission on Higher Education. He is a member of the Democratic Party, Vice President of the National Conference of Democratic Mayors, and Chair of U.S. Conference of Mayors' Jobs, Education, and Workforce Committee. He is openly gay.

Early life
Enrolling as a founding pupil at the Center for Enriched Studies, the first magnet school in Los Angeles and the centerpiece of the district's voluntary integration program instituted following a court finding of racial segregation, Christopher Cabaldon first became involved in politics as a seventh-grader, speaking at conferences and in media interviews on the subject of desegregation.  He became student body president at the school.
 
Cabaldon earned his BS in Environmental Economics at the University of California, Berkeley, where he was student body vice president. He earned a Masters in Public Policy and Administration at California State University, Sacramento in its founding class, where he later taught as an adjunct faculty member, received the institution's "Distinguished Service Award," and later was appointed as a tenured faculty member to one of the university's first endowed chairs

Education career
Cabaldon began in government as Chief Consultant and Staff Director at the age of 24 to the California State Assembly Higher Education Committee and then Chief of Staff to the chair of Appropriations Committee. He began his professional career as Legislative Director of the University of California Students Association, before working for legislative higher education committee chairs Tom Hayden (of the Chicago Seven) and Marguerite Archie-Hudson (who succeeded Maxine Waters in the Assembly and later served as president of Talladega College).

From 1997 to 2003, Cabaldon was vice chancellor of the California Community Colleges System, with executive responsibility for policy, planning, strategy, research, information systems and data, governmental relations, public affairs, and other initiatives for the system of 110 colleges. He then took over as chief executive officer of EdVoice, a nonprofit education advocacy organization founded and chaired by Reed Hastings.  He later served as president of the Linked Learning Alliance, program officer for the California Education Policy Fund, and co-director of the California Legislative Staff Education Institute.

California Governor Jerry Brown appointed Cabaldon as the state's representative on the Western Interstate Commission on Higher Education, with unanimous Senate confirmation, in 2011 and again in 2014 and 2018. Cabaldon is chair of the commission's policy and research committee. In 2019, he facilitated a review of the California Master Plan for Higher Education for the Governor.

In 2019, Cabaldon was appointed to the tenured faculty of California State University, Sacramento as the Hazel Cramer Endowed Chair and Professor of Public Policy and Administration. Cabaldon has served as President of Asian Pacific Americans in Higher Education (APAHE), and as a director for the Cal Alumni Association, Foundation for the California Community Colleges, University of California, Davis School of Education and EdSource.

In 2015, President Obama appointed Cabaldon to the National Advisory Board, chaired by Dr. Jill Biden, for America's College Promise.

Mayor of West Sacramento
Cabaldon became Mayor of West Sacramento in 1998 and served in that capacity for all but two of the subsequent 22 years. He was the city's mayor longer than all other mayors, combined. At the conclusion of his final term, the Sacramento Bee reported that "the hallmark of Cabaldon’s time in the mayor’s chair of West Sacramento has been a time of collaboration and inspiration."

Cabaldon was Chair of the Jobs, Education & the Workforce Committee at the United States Conference of Mayors, where he was elected to the board in June 2011 and then as a trustee in 2019. He had led West Sacramento to be one of the first small/medium cities in the nation to connect all children to high-quality preschool, winning the "America's Most Livable Small City" award from the mayors' organization. He joined a network of a dozen cities in digital badge initiative launched at South by Southwest's education festival to support out-of-classroom learning, skills, and microcredentials for local teens; this work became a national model. Building on the preschool and digital badging initiatives, Cabaldon launched the West Sacramento Home Run, adding college savings accounts for kindergarteners, tuition-free community college for all graduating public school seniors, and a forthcoming scholarship. In 2020, he made West Sacramento the first city in the nation to send a letter of college admission and a scholarship offer to every graduating high school senior. The West Sacramento Home Run has been widely recognized as one of the nation's most innovative and comprehensive initiatives to improve educational attainment and economic opportunity.

Governing reported that "Cabaldon’s approach to leadership has meant that West Sacramento is often at the surprising forefront of municipal policy and experimentation. When he speaks, his big-city peers usually do pay attention. 'When you see his hand go up,' says Tom Cochran, executive director of the U.S. Conference of Mayors, 'you get off your device, you quit your Googling and you listen.'”  His initiatives for "repairing roads and trails, reducing homelessness, creating new educational and career paths for residents, and — ultimately — building a place where people can and want to live" were, according to StateScoop, "already are making West Sacramento’s suite of projects uncommonly well-rounded, innovative and ambitious for a city government — particularly for a municipality of just 50,000 people."

In June 2007 Cabaldon authored a resolution for the US Conference of Mayors that supported the Filipino Veterans Fairness Act, that was passed unanimously at the annual conference. In June 2009 he pushed through the most sweeping gay civil rights resolution of any national elected officials organization, US Conference of Mayors Resolution No. 46, 2008 winning support for marriage equality, hate crimes, employment nondiscrimination, and repeal of Don't Ask, Don't Tell.  A member of Mayors for the Freedom to Marry, he and the Mayor Stephanie Rawlings-Blake of Baltimore and Mayor Julián Castro of San Antonio published a column, Gay marriage a question of justice, in USA Today in January 2013. In 2019, Cabaldon was named chair of the LGBTQ Mayors Alliance.  He is a member of the Mayors Against Illegal Guns Coalition, and a signer of the US Mayors Climate Protection Agreement. Cabaldon was Vice President of the National Conference of Democratic Mayors. He was founder and chairman of the board for the Asian Pacific Youth Leadership Project, a founding member and president of both the Asian Pacific Islander caucus and LGBT Local Officials caucus of the League of California Cities, and a founding member of the Capital Unity Council, a group created to eradicate hate crime violence.

As chair of the Sacramento Area Council of Governments Cabaldon led the region's historic "Blueprint for the Future", which under his leadership won prestigious awards from the US Environmental Protection Agency, two Governors, and a diverse array of national, state, regional, civic, business, and environmental organizations for land-use planning and smart growth strategies.

He has served on an array of state and regional commissions, including being appointed by the Speaker of the Assembly to the Commission on Regionalism, President of the Yolo County Health Council,member of the Blue Ribbon Committee for the Governor's Initiative to Turn Around Failing Schools, appointed by Governor Gray Davis to the Central Valley Regional Water Quality Control Board, and a member of the Sacramento-San Joaquin Delta Protection Commission. He was President of the National Brownfields Association (California), chair of the Yolo County Transportation District, chair of the Yolo County Health Council, and a director for the Great Valley Center.

Along with Georgia State Senator Elena Parent, Cabaldon co-chaired The NewDEAL education policy working group of state and local policymakers from throughout the country. The two co-chairs published a column in The Atlanta Journal-Constitution, "Internet Access is a Right for Every Student", in 2020.

After leaving office, Cabaldon joined the Ewing Marion Kauffman Foundation Mayors Council and the Draper Richards Kaplan Foundation Mayors Council to advance philanthropic investment in entrepreneurship, innovation, and social impact.

Elections
Cabaldon was selected mayor of West Sacramento by fellow council members in November 1998, after first being elected to the City Council in 1996. The council chose him for three more one year terms as mayor. In 2004, he won West Sacramento's first direct mayoral election. He was re-elected mayor by the electorate in 2006, 2008, and 2010, was unopposed in the November 2012 general election, reelected with 84.3% of the vote in the 2014 general election, unopposed in the 2016 general election, and re-elected in 2018. In 2020, he was defeated by City Council member Martha Guerrero.

He was a candidate for the 8th district seat in the California State Assembly in 2008, losing the primary by three percentage points to Yolo County Supervisor Mariko Yamada.

Cabaldon served as California co-chair of Pete Buttigieg's presidential campaign. Along with Dayton, Ohio Mayor Nan Whaley and Austin, Texas Mayor Steve Adler (politician), he introduced Buttigieg at the launch of the presidential campaign in 2019 in South Bend, Indiana.

Personal life
The Logo network featured Cabaldon in a 2006 episode of the series Coming Out Stories, when he came out publicly in his annual State of the City address.

An in-depth Comstock's Magazine cover story, Behind Closed Doors, told the story of the death of Cabaldon's mother when he was a young boy and the ongoing process of coping, persevering, and finding meaning and purpose after loss.

References

External links 

 
 Official homepage
 Bio page on West Sacramento site
 Professional bio from Capitol Impact

American mayors of Filipino descent
American politicians of Filipino descent
Gay politicians
California politicians of Filipino descent
LGBT mayors of places in the United States
Mayors of places in California
1965 births
Living people
People from West Sacramento, California
California Democrats
American LGBT people of Asian descent
LGBT people from California
21st-century LGBT people